Erythronium quinaultense, the Quinault fawn-lily, is a rare plant species endemic to a small region around Lake Quinault in Olympic National Park, Washington state, United States.

Erythronium quinaultense produces egg-shaped bulbs up to 75 mm long. Leaves are up to 20 cm long. Scape is up to 25 cm long, bearing 1–3 flowers. Tepals have yellow, white and pink bands perpendicular to the veins.

References

quinaultense
Endemic flora of Washington (state)
Plants described in 2001
Olympic National Park
Flora without expected TNC conservation status